White Noise: The Light, also marketed as White Noise 2, is a 2007 supernatural horror thriller film directed by Patrick Lussier and starring Nathan Fillion and Katee Sackhoff. Written by Matt Venne, it is a stand-alone sequel to the 2005 film White Noise, directed by Geoffrey Sax.

The film received a theatrical release internationally on January 5, 2007, but was released direct-to-video in the United States on January 8, 2008. The film received generally positive reviews, but was not commercially successful, and failed to recoup its $10 million budget.

Plot
After witnessing the murder of his wife and young son at the hands of Henry Caine (Craig Fairbrass), who then turned the gun on himself, Abe Dale (Nathan Fillion) is so distressed that he attempts to take his own life. A near-death experience follows that leaves Abe with the ability to identify those who are about to die.  He acts on these premonitions to save three people from death, among them a nurse met during his recovery, Sherry Clarke (Katee Sackhoff).

Abe soon learns that Henry, before murdering Abe's wife and son, actually saved their lives.  Abe concludes that Henry also had the ability to see death.  Wanting to learn more about Henry, Abe visits his house only to learn that Henry survived his suicide.  Investigating further, Abe discovers the phenomenon of "Tria Mera", The Third Day, when Christ was resurrected.  Also on the third day the devil takes possession of the mortals who cheated death. Abe concludes that three days after he saved their lives, those he saved will be possessed and compelled to take the lives of others. Accepting this responsibility, Abe comes to terms with the horrible fact that he must consider killing those he had saved to prevent further tragedy.

Abe tries unsuccessfully to prevent the second man he saved from killing others, but arrives just a minute too late. Abe is able however to take the gun from the man before he kills himself. Abe tries to explain the situation to Sherry but she is at first non-receptive and he must follow her to the cafe where his wife and son were murdered. While driving he sees his own aura in the rear view mirror, predicting his own death. This time, Sherry listens but, just as Abe brings up the gun, police who are already in the cafe shoot him dead. Abe spends his last minutes trying to convince Sherry she must kill herself before her own possession is complete. However, as she reaches for the gun the police pick it up and she becomes hysterical, and is put into an ambulance.

As the ambulance leaves, Sherry struggles against the demons inside her. Back at the cafe, Abe's life force leaves his body as a lightning streak in pursuit of Sherry's ambulance vaulting from one utility post to the next. He reaches the ambulance and appears to Sherry as a spectre of himself. He is able to comfort her before the demons possess her. She acknowledges him and expires peacefully after he places his hand over her heart. Up ahead, the speeding ambulance is unaware of an accident blocking its path. An 18-wheel fuel tanker is disabled and a commuter bus is stopped. Abe, still manifested as a ghostly spirit, appears on the street directly in front of the ambulance, causing the driver to swerve, avoid the accident at the last minute and miss the tanker, thus saving the people on the bus. Abe's mission completed, he finally sees a bright white light in front of him with his family waiting in the distance and is able to move on. Back at Blackmount County Asylum, Henry is tormented and driven further insane by the restless spirits of all the victims who died at the hands of people he saved.

Cast
 Nathan Fillion as Abe Dale
 Katee Sackhoff as Sherry Clarke
 Craig Fairbrass as Henry Caine
 Adrian Holmes as Marty Bloom
 Kendall Cross as Rebecca Dale
 Teryl Rothery as Julia Caine
 William MacDonald as Dr. Karras
 David Milchard as Kurt Green
 Tegan Moss as Liz
 Chris Shields	as Father Nathan
 David Orth as Dr. Serling

Production
Budgeted at approximately $10 million, the film is rated PG-13 for intense sequences of violence and terror, some disturbing images, thematic material and some language.

Release
The film was released to 915 movie theaters internationally and was released direct-to-video in the United States on January 8, 2008.

Home Media
The film's first Blu-ray release occurred in Canada on November 18, 2008, in a double feature with the first film. It has since gone out of print. The film debuted on Blu-ray for the first time in the United States on February 11, 2020, in a double feature release with Rosewood Lane (2011). The disc was released by Mill Creek Entertainment.

Soundtrack
In the film, Abe witnesses a children's prayer concert that includes "The Spirit of Radio" by Rush, as arranged by Terry Frewer, a Vancouver-based composer, and performed by the Vancouver Bach Children's Chorus. Soloists for this performance include Madeline Busby and Olivia Curth.

Box office
White Noise: The Light grossed US$8.52 million internationally as of January 27, 2008.

Reception
The film received better reviews than its predecessor. , the review aggregate website Rotten Tomatoes reported a 75% approval rating with an average rating of 5.14 out of 10, based on eight reviews.

References

External links
 
 
 
 

2007 films
American supernatural horror films
Canadian supernatural horror films
English-language Canadian films
2007 horror films
Films directed by Patrick Lussier
Films scored by Normand Corbeil
Films shot in Vancouver
American ghost films
Rogue (company) films
American supernatural thriller films
Gold Circle Films films
Brightlight Pictures films
2000s English-language films
2000s American films
2000s Canadian films